Carlalberto Ludi (born 24 December 1982) is a former Italian footballer.

Honours
Lega Pro Prima Divisione:  2010

References

Italian footballers
Serie A players
Serie B players
Novara F.C. players
Pisa S.C. players
A.C. Prato players
F.C. Pro Vercelli 1892 players
Montevarchi Calcio Aquila 1902 players
Association football central defenders
1982 births
Living people